PCJJ (later known as PCJ) was a pioneering shortwave radio station in the Netherlands operated by Philips Radio on behalf of Philips Laboratories, a division of Philips Electronics. It was the first shortwave radio station in Europe, and the first dedicated shortwave radio station in the world - previous stations had simulcast AM/medium wave broadcasts.

History
The station officially went on the air on 11 March 1927, broadcasting on 9.93 MHz in a transmission to the Dutch East Indies with the words, "Hello Dutch East Indies, this is PCJJ, the shortwave transmitter of Philips Laboratories in Eindhoven." PCJJ was soon broadcasting in English, Spanish, German and Dutch to a worldwide audience.

On 30 May and 1 June 1927, Queen Wilhelmina and Crown Princess Juliana spoke over PCJJ to their colonial subjects in the Dutch East and West Indies.

PCJJ was likely the first shortwave radio station in the world to provide distinct programming rather than a simulcast of domestic stations.

The multilingual Edward "Eddy" Startz joined PCJJ in 1928 and became its best known announcer. He created the light entertainment Happy Station show which became the world's longest running shortwave program and informally rechristened the station name PCJ for Peace, Cheer and Joy.

In July 1927, Philips established PHOHI (Philips Omroep Holland-Indië or Philips Holland-India Broadcasting Station). The new venture originally shared PCJJ's transmitter until December 1928 when PCJJ's sister transmitter PHI was completed for PHOHI programming. PHI broadcast in Dutch to the Dutch East Indies (now Indonesia) and the Dutch West Indies (now the Netherlands Antilles) while PCJJ now broadcast in English, Spanish and German to Europe and the rest of the world. In 1929, PCJJ was renamed PCJ. Beginning in February 1929, PCJ broadcast experimental radio programmes on behalf of the League of Nations using the call letters PCLL. The shows were produced in Geneva and sent to PCJ via landline. The service was known as "Radio Nations" and its  broadcasts via PCJ continued until the League of Nations' own transmitters, HBL and HBP were inaugurated in 1932.

PHI ceased broadcasting in 1930 due to the government's new regulations regarding Dutch language broadcasting, although PCJ continued to air. PHI was able to resume broadcasting in 1934 and would broadcast Dutch as well as English programming to the Eastern Hemisphere which PCJ broadcast to the Western Hemisphere.

In 1937, the transmitters were relocated to Huizen with studios in nearby Hilversum. The transmitter complex comprised 24 antennas on  wooden antenna towers weighing 18 tons each, which were built on concentric rails to allow them to be rotated so that they could be aimed in any direction. Reception would equal that of a 2000 kilowatt station.

Broadcasts from the Netherlands were interrupted by the German invasion in May 1940. PCJ broadcast the events of the invasion for four days until Eddy Startz was arrested. The staff of PCJ tried to destroy the Huizen transmitters, but they were repaired by the Germans used for black propaganda to India under the name ”The Voice of Free India”. Transmissions from the occupied facility were also heard as far away as Australia using the call sign DXL15.

PCJ resumed broadcasting in October 1945, as a result of the liberation of the Netherlands. The two shortwave stations were nationalised and became Radio Netherlands Worldwide, the Dutch International Service on 15 April 1947 though PCJ programs such as Happy Station continued on the new station and the PCJ call letters were kept by Radio Netherlands for several years.

The Taiwan-based PCJ Radio, which produces the revived Happy Station show, takes its name from the original PCJ.

References

Broadcasting on the short waves, 1945 to today By Jerome S. Berg
50 Years of Shortwave in Holland Radio Netherlands

External links
Radio Without Borders history of PCJ and PHOI

Shortwave radio stations
Defunct radio stations in the Netherlands
Mass media in Hilversum
Mass media in Eindhoven
Entertainment in the Dutch East Indies
Radio stations established in 1927
Radio stations disestablished in 1947